Roman Vorobey (born 22 February 1994 in Chernihiv) is a Ukrainian football midfielder.

Career
Vorobey is a product of his native Chernihiv's Yunist Chernihiv  youth sportive school system. The sports school is known for its talent players like Andriy Yarmolenko, Pavlo Polehenko, Serhiy Kovalenko, Vladyslav Shapoval, Pavlo Fedosov, Yuriy Maley, Oleksiy Khoblenko, Dimitry MironenkoAndriy Fedorenko,  and Nika Sichinava.

He played in the different Ukrainian amateur and Second League clubs. In March 2015 Vorobey signed a contract with FC Skala and in July 2015 returned in the Belarusian Premier League club FC Slavia Mozyr.

References

External links
 
 
 

1994 births
Living people
Footballers from Chernihiv
Ukrainian footballers
Association football midfielders
Expatriate footballers in Belarus
Expatriate footballers in Kazakhstan
Expatriate footballers in Poland
Ukrainian expatriate footballers
FC Yunist Chernihiv players
FC Slavia Mozyr players
FC Skala Stryi (2004) players
FC Inhulets Petrove players
FC Inhulets-2 Petrove players
FC Hirnyk-Sport Horishni Plavni players
FC Real Pharma Odesa players
Unia Tarnów players
FC Belshina Bobruisk players